The 1888 United States presidential election in Oregon took place on November 6, 1888, as part of the 1888 United States presidential election. Voters chose three representatives, or electors to the Electoral College, who voted for president and vice president.

Oregon voted for the Republican nominee, Benjamin Harrison, over the Democratic nominee, incumbent President Grover Cleveland. Harrison won the state by a margin of 10.94%.

Results

Results by county

See also
 United States presidential elections in Oregon

Notes

References

Oregon
1888
1888 Oregon elections